Henry Vogel (June 15, 1863 – June 17, 1925) was an American actor and bass-baritone singer who originated several roles on the Broadway stage during the first two decades of the Twentieth Century.

Early life
Henry Vogel was born Heinrich Vogelhut in Mindszent, Hungary. Ignoring his parents' wishes that he enter the clergy, he left Hungary for America in 1882.

Career
After his arrival in America, he obtained US citizenship and attended the Balatka Academy of Musical Art, founded by Hans Balatka in Chicago during the late 1880s. There (as Henry Vogelhuth), he performed in several of its productions before moving to New York City. In 1890 (as Henry Vogel) he appeared in an English-language version of Jacques Offenbach's The Brigands starring Lillian Russell, and in 1903, he landed a role in the Broadway production of Nancy Brown. Other productions followed, including Paris by Night (1904), Miss Dolly Dollars (1905), and Victor Herbert’s The Wizard of the Nile (1908).

It was announced in the press in 1907 that Byron Ongley (co-author of Brewster’s Millions) had written a vaudeville skit for him, Vogel, the Boy Detective, and His Shadow, Nearly – the shadow to be played by a midget.

Back on the Broadway stage in 1909, he played Herr Pappelmeister to Walker Whiteside’s David Quixano in the original 1909 production of Israel Zangwill’s play, The Melting Pot. His turn as Pappelmeister received acclaim, and the production itself was favorably reviewed by then US president Theodore Roosevelt.

 
Vogel went on to prominent roles in several other Broadway plays and operettas, including The Firefly (1912), Marie-Odile (1915), and Arms and the Girl (1916). Health issues caused him to move to California to pursue work in films, including The Spanish Dancer (1923) as Olivares, but continued ill health forced his retirement and return to New York.

Family
Henry Vogel was the son of David Vogelhut and Eleanora "Leni" Vogelhut (née Propper) and was Jewish.

Death
Henry Vogel died in New York City two days after his 62nd birthday, following a heart attack.

Selected plays
 Nancy Brown (1903), Henry Vogel as Baron Sauerbraten
 Miss Dolly Dollars (1905) as Lieutenant von Richter
 The Wizard of the Nile (1908) as King Ptolemy
 Dolly Varden (Previous to May 1908, Bijou, New Brunswick, N.J)
 The Melting Pot (1909) as Herr Pappelmeister 
 The Little Damozel (1910)
 Paris By Night  as Orlof Sleuthski (1904–05)
 The Girl and the Governor (Circa 1907/08)
 The Firefly (1912) as Herr Franz 
 Marie-Odile as Sergeant Otto Beck (1915) 
 Arms and the Girl (originally titled A Delicate Situation)(1916) as General Klaus
 Princess Tra-La-La (1916)
 Some Daddy (1918)

External links

References

1863 births
1925 deaths
19th-century American male actors
American male stage actors
20th-century American male actors
Jewish American male actors